Colton Sceviour (born April 20, 1989) is a Canadian professional ice hockey right winger for SC Bern of the National League (NL). He was selected by the Dallas Stars in the fourth round, 112th overall, at the 2007 NHL Entry Draft.

Early life
Sceviour was born on April 20, 1989, in Red Deer, Alberta, Canada. His father Darin played hockey growing up, including one game in the NHL for the Chicago Blackhawks.

Playing career
Growing up in Alberta, Sceviour played minor ice hockey for the Tinners Little Caps, winning back to back Novice Tier I Red Deer Minor Hockey league championships in 1998 and 1999. In 2000, Sceviour played atom AA hockey for the Red Deer Titan Electric Chiefs whom won the B final at the St Alberta atom AA hockey tournament. He moved up the ranks of minor hockey and in 2003 became the youngest player on the Red Deer AAA bantam Rebels roster.

Sceviour played midget AAA ice hockey for the Optimist Rebels as a 15-year-old before joining the Portland Winterhawks full-time the following season. In his rookie season with the Winterhawks, he suffered a broken jaw during a game against the Spokane Chiefs and was ineligible to play for Team Canada at the World U-17 Hockey Challenge. He returned to the Winterhawks for his sophomore season and recorded seven goals and 30 points in 37 games before suffering a broken foot. The 2006–07 season would be his last full season with the Winterhawks as he was traded to the Lethbridge Hurricanes alongside Nick Hotson and Lucas Alexiuk in November 2007.

Professional

Dallas Stars

Sceviour completed his major junior ice hockey career by signing a three-year contract with the Texas Stars, Dallas' American Hockey League (AHL) affiliate, for the 2009–10 AHL season.

Sceviour was called up from the Texas Stars, Dallas' American Hockey League (AHL) affiliate, to join the Dallas Stars when Rich Peverley was unable to play. He recorded his first career NHL goal in his season debut with Dallas on December 14, 2013, against Ondřej Pavelec of the Winnipeg Jets.

Florida Panthers
After seven seasons within the Stars organization, Sceviour left as a free agent and signed a two-year contract with the Florida Panthers on July 1, 2016. He was named to their opening night roster and scored his first goal with the team a few days later. By the end of October, Sceviour has recorded five goals and was tied for second in the league.

On February 12, 2018, Sceviour signed a three-year, $3.6 million contract extension with the Panthers. At the time of his signing, he had recorded 38 points in 126 games with the team and logged the second most short-handed ice time among all Panthers forwards  Upon signing his extension, Sceviour said he chose to remain with the team due to their promising future. He concluded the season with 24 points in 76 games.

The following season, Sceviour's playing time was greatly reduced and he skated in only 56 games for the Panthers. On February 10, 2019, Sceviour was placed on injured reserve by the Panthers who also recalled Jamie McGinn to replace him in the lineup.

Pittsburgh Penguins
After four seasons with the Panthers, on September 24, 2020, Sceviour was traded to the Pittsburgh Penguins, along with Mike Matheson, in exchange for Patric Hörnqvist. He was placed on waivers by the Penguins on April 10, 2021, in order to allow them to move him to the taxi squad or Wilkes-Barre/Scranton Penguins throughout the season. After passing waivers, he scored two goals for the team in a 5–2 win over the New Jersey Devils.

Edmonton Oilers
As a free agent from the Penguins following his lone season with the club, Sceviour went un-signed over the summer, later accepting an Professional Try-out contract to attend the Edmonton Oilers training camp for the  season on September 16, 2021. He successfully made the team, signing a one-year contract on October 13, 2021.

SC Bern  
After his season in Edmonton, Sceviour left the Oilers, and went overseas to sign a one-year contract with Swiss club, SC Bern of the National League on August 15, 2022.

Personal life
Sceviour and his wife have one son together.

Career statistics

Awards and honours

References

External links

1989 births
Bakersfield Condors players
SC Bern players
Canadian ice hockey right wingers
Dallas Stars draft picks
Dallas Stars players
Edmonton Oilers players
Florida Panthers players
Ice hockey people from Alberta
Lethbridge Hurricanes players
Living people
Pittsburgh Penguins players
Portland Winterhawks players
Sportspeople from Red Deer, Alberta
Texas Stars players